Saint-Aubin-de-Branne (literally Saint-Aubin of Branne) is a commune in the Gironde department in Nouvelle-Aquitaine in southwestern France.

Population

See also
Communes of the Gironde department

References

Communes of Gironde